Paul Hanson is an American bassoonist, saxophonist, duduk player, and composer with roots in jazz and classical music.

Music career 
Paul Hanson was born in San Francisco, CA, in 1961. His parents were both musicians: his mother a classical pianist and his father a music teacher in the Berkeley Unified School District. In high school, Hanson performed in the Young People's Symphony Orchestra (YPSO) and participated in a concerto competition curated by the San Francisco Symphony. He won the competition in the woodwinds division, receiving the Pepsi Young Musician Award. At the young age of seventeen, Hanson recorded alto saxophone on the album Pillars by Peter Apfelbaum & the Hieroglyphics Ensemble. Since then, his career has expanded vastly into multiple genres. He has performed with Cirque du Soleil, who had created a role specifically for him in the show ZED.

Hanson has received various awards. The National Endowment of the Arts awarded Hanson with a jazz performance grant in 1995. He was the Robert Mondavi Concerto Competition winner as a student in 1984. With Béla Fleck and the Flecktones, he recorded Outbound, which won a Grammy in 2000. Hanson was the Grand Prize winner of JAZZIZ Magazine's Woodwinds on Fire award in 1995. Hanson has taught numerous master classes worldwide, including Ithaca College, Penn State University, Arizona State University, Oklahoma University, University of Wisconsin, Memphis State University, University of Northeastern Oklahoma, University of Arkansas, and Portland State University-all, specializing in modern performance techniques and improvisation for double reed instruments. Hanson has also taught privately in the San Francisco Bay Area.

Hanson has performed and recorded with the likes of:

 Abraham Laboriel
 Béla Fleck and the Flecktones
 Billy Childs
 Billy Cobham
 Billy Higgins
 Brian Blade
 Charlie Hunter
 Contra Costa Chamber Orchestra
 Craig Erikson
 David Binney
 DAVKA
 Dennis Chambers
 Eddie Money
 Jeff Denson
 Jeff Sipe
 Joel Harrison
 Jonas Hellborg
 Kai Eckhardt
 Karen Blixt
 King Baldwin
 Medeski Martin & Wood
 Miguel Zenón
 Napa Symphony Orchestra
 Oakland Eastbay Symphony Orchestra
 Oaktown Irawo
 Omar Sosa
 Patrice Rushen
 Pat Senatore
 Peter Apfelbaum
 Peter Erskine
 Randy Brecker
 Ray Charles
 Rob Wasserman
 SF Jazz
 St. Joseph Ballet Company
 The Klezmorim
 The Paul Dresher Ensemble
 Sawalé
 T Lavitz
 Victor Wooten
 Wayne Shorter

Hanson has performed alongside great musicians and led his solo bassoon show and the Paul Hanson Quintet ‒ both internationally performing ensembles.

Discography

Appears On

References

External links
Official site

See also
Bassoon#Jazz

Year of birth missing (living people)
American jazz bassoonists
American male jazz musicians
American jazz saxophonists
American male saxophonists
Berkeley High School (Berkeley, California) alumni
Musicians from the San Francisco Bay Area
Living people
Place of birth missing (living people)
21st-century American saxophonists
Jazz musicians from California
21st-century American male musicians